The Sophie Brody Award is an annual award of the American Library Association, administered by the Reference and User Services Association RUSA.   It is given for outstanding achievement in Jewish literature, for works published the previous year, in the US.

The award is named after Sophie Brody and was established by her husband, Arthur Brody, and the Brodart Foundation.

Honorees

See also
 Sophie Brody

References

External links
 ALA award page
 2014 "Like Dreamers" press release

American Library Association awards
Jewish literary awards
English-language literary awards
Lists of books